The Twenty Grand is the name given to the one-off custom 1933 Rollston Arlington Torpedo-bodied Duesenberg SJ ultra-luxury sedan. The design's initial price tag of an astronomical $20,000 during the height of the Great Depression infamously gave it its nickname of Twenty Grand. Widely considered to be the most beautiful Duesenberg ever built and the pioneer of the ultra-luxury car concept, it is one of the most valuable cars in the world, worth over $40 million today.

Jay Leno described the 320 horsepower Twenty Grand the 20th century equivalent of the Bugatti Veyron in regards to the unprecedented engine power output of each of the vehicles for their time.

The Twenty Grand is the flagship vehicle of the Nethercutt Collection and was restored by J.B. Nethercutt. It won Best of Show at the 1980 Pebble Beach Concours d'Elegance and is undefeated in Concours d'Elegance competition.

History 
Luxury brands Duesenberg and Rollston contracted automobile designer Gordon Buehrig for a ultra-luxury one-off design to be the leading automotive "Dream Car" display representing the progress of the United States automotive industry at the 1933 Chicago World's Fair. Once completed in Indianapolis, the finished automobile's set price was an astronomical $20,000 during the middle of the Great Depression where cars typically cost around $600–800, infamously giving it the nickname of The Twenty Grand. Ultimately because of its unprecedented price tag, it was proven too expensive for the American wealthy and foreign dignitaries at the World's Fair. 

Due to the further deterioration of the economy from the Great Depression, the Twenty Grand was untouched for a year until it was sold to Shreve Archer in the following 1934 leg of the same fair for $20,000 dollars, making it the second most expensive Duesenberg ever sold new. Later the Twenty Grand would go on to have several other owners where it the interior was modernized.

In 1979, cosmetics entrepreneur J.B. Nethercutt purchased the Twenty Grand for $130,000, making it one of the then-most expensive vehicle purchases up to that time. He gave it a full original restoration at the Nethercutt Collection, changing the exterior color from black to a metallic silver and reverting the interior to its original 1930s opulence. Once the restoration was completed, Nethercutt entered it into the pinnacle Pebble Beach Concours d'Elegance in 1980, where it ultimately won Best of Show. In the late 1980s the Twenty Grand was selected to be exhibited in Essen, Germany as one of “The Ten Most Beautiful Cars in the World.”  It won Best of Show at the 2011 Amelia Island Concours d'Elegance and at the 2022 Las Vegas Concours d'Elegance.

Replica 
In 2012 a 1:1 fan-made replica vehicle was constructed as tribute to The Twenty Grand that included a supercharged Ford V8 engine. The replica was auctioned off in Scottsdale, Arizona for over $100,000.

In popular culture 
In 2023 it was featured on the Jay Leno's Garage episode "The Most Famous Duesenberg of All Time." In the show the Twenty Grand was driven on the Hollywood Burbank Airport taxiway with a police escort instead of the regular Burbank city streets. Jay Leno described the Twenty Grand as the 20th century equivalent of the Bugatti Veyron in regards to the unprecedented incredible aspects of each of the vehicles for their eras.

Specifications 
Engine Type: Supercharged DOHC

Cylinders: 8

Horsepower: 320

Manufacturer: Duesenberg, (Indianapolis, Indiana)

Coachbuilder: Rollston, (New York City)

Price When New: $20,000

See also 

 Bugatti Type 51 Dubos

References 

 
Vintage vehicles
Nethercutt-Richards family
Duesenberg vehicles
1930s cars
One-off cars